The Celts: First Masters of Europe (US title: The Celts: Conquerors of Ancient Europe) is a 1992 illustrated monograph on the history of the Celts. Written by French Celticist Christiane Éluère, and published by Éditions Gallimard as the 158th volume in the "Découvertes" collection, in collaboration with the Réunion des Musées Nationaux. According to the German archaeologist , this "little book is aimed at the general public who have an increasingly 'visual interest' in ancient cultures and the alike".

Contents and synopsis 
Christiane Éluère traces more than half a millennium of the Celtic history with an archaeological approach, from roughly 9th century BC to the 1st century AD, and the survival of their culture to the island peoples, eventually reborn in the art of Celtic Christianity.

The book opens with a series of bronze masks and hoary faces carved in stone from 7th century BC to 1st century AD, which were discovered in France, Austria and Bohemia. The body text is divided into six chapters: 1, "Birth of a Warrior Aristocracy"; 2, "The First Celtic Princes"; 3, "The All-Conquering Celts"; 4, "The Celts Against the Might of Rome"; 5, "Realms of Religion"; 6, "Celtic Memories".

The following "Documents" section is made up of an anthology divided into nine parts, which delves into more specialised texts and relevant authors on multiple aspects of the Celts, including an introduction of homosexuality among the ancient Celts.

 Celtic territory on the map of the ancient world;
 Classic portraits of early 'European Man';
 Society and private life;
 Languages and writing in Celtic culture;
 Were the Celts bloodthirsty warriors?;
 The druids;
 Celtic gold;
 Celtic art (English edition exclusive);
 The first British heroine (English edition exclusive)
 Further reading
 List of illustrations
 Index
 Acknowledgments/Photo credits

Reception 
Sarah Anderson wrote in her book Anderson's Travel Companion: "[The book] is concise, well illustrated and packed with nuggets of information."

However, it is regrettable that the almost abusive use of examples, at the expense of a generalization, and of a comprehensive idea of the Celts' lifestyle."

In its book review section, the archaeology magazine Minerva gave a positive review to the book: "The book treads a well worn path, leading us from the late Hallstatt  ('princely seats' or 'seats of princes') through the development and spread of the La Tène culture across Europe and the emergence of Roman power. [...] The present version adheres closely to the original and in an excellent translation retains the flowing, elegant quality of the original French."

See also 

 Celtic art
 Celtic culture
 Celtic studies
 Celtic mythology
 Celtic Otherworld
 Celtic Revival
 Ancient Celtic religion
 The Celts (BBC documentary)
 The Celts (S4C documentary)

References

External links 
  
 

1992 non-fiction books
20th-century history books
History books about ethnic groups
History books about Europe
Books about civilizations
Archaeology books
Découvertes Gallimard
Celtic history
Celtic studies